Domenico Siciliani (1 May 1879 – 6 May 1938) was an Italian general. He was the deputy governor of Cyrenaica (January 1929-March 1930) representing Pietro Badoglio, who had become the unique governor of Tripolitania and Cyrenaica since 24 January 1929.

References 

1879 births
1938 deaths
Italian colonial governors and administrators
Italian military personnel of the Italo-Turkish War
Italian military personnel of World War I
Italian military personnel of the Second Italo-Ethiopian War